The Fishing Museum is a museum opened in 2002 and dedicated to the knowledge and dissemination of fishing and the maritime heritage of the Costa Brava. It's located in the area of the fishing port of Palamós, in the old port warehouse called "Tinglado". The permanent exhibition explains the history, the current affairs and the future of Costa Brava fishing in terms of sustainability.

The Fishing Museum is a municipal facility managed by the Fundació Promediterrània.

Origin 
The origin of the Fishing Museum starts in 1920, when the Cau de la Costa Brava was created in order to set up a new museum. In 1994, the City Council of Palamós signed an agreement with the University of Girona, which allowed to create a field of study and investigation to create the museum project. As a result of this collaboration, the project was redefined to turn it into a thematic museum dedicated to the fishing in the Costa Brava. In 1999, the project for the Inventory of Maritime and Fishing Heritage of the Costa Brava began, as part of the Ethnological Heritage Inventory of Catalonia. Another aim in the development of the project was the proposal to change the headquarters to one located in the fishing port, much more linked to the theme. In 1999 Ports of the Generalitat de Catalunya ceded the 'Tinglado' building where nowadays is located the Fishing Museum.

Currently, the Fishing Museum is part of the Costa Brava Museums Network, the Network of Museums of Ethnology, the Network of Maritime Museums of the Catalan Coast, the Territorial Network of Museums of the Counties of Girona, the ICOM (International Council of Museums), the ICMM (International Council of Maritime Museums) and the AMMM (Association of Mediterranean Maritime Museums).

Mission and goals 
The main mission of the Fishing Museum is "contributing, as an element of quality, to the cultural, economic and social development of the community. It works to strengthen his own territory and to help about changes and reflections on the marine and fishing heritage that favor society.

Its objectives are to guarantee the conservation, protection and safeguarding of the collections of the Museum, to promote research on the maritime and fishery aspects and to contribute to raising awareness towards sustainability.

In this way, the Fishing Museum shows the history of the elemental relationship between Man and the sea with an open, participatory and interpretative format, enabling visitors to feel part of a story that centers on fish and fishing, one which will leave them with a new way of viewing this ancient, seafaring trade. The museum is a place of dialogue between fishermen and society, and aims to recover and preserve the ideas of an ancient tradition, while helping visitors to discover an exciting, yet fragile world.

The exhibition 
The permanent exhibition of the Fishing Museum is located in the Tinglado building, an old port warehouse built in the 1930s. The museum project was commissioned by the architects Dani Freixes, Eulàlia González and Artur Arias, and was awarded the National Design Award in 2001.

Awards 
 Sea Heritage Best Communication Campaign 2012
 Tourist Quality in Destinations - SICTED 2010
 European Museum Forum of the Year Award 2005

Services and facilities 
The Fishing Museum has different services and facilities to achieve its mission and goals.

Espai del Peix (Gastronomic place) 
The "Espai del Peix" is a cultural equipment located on the fish market at Palamós port that works as a gastronomic place. It contributes to the knowledge and sustainability of fishery products and their gastronomy, claiming and educating those unlisted species, but with a high culinary and gastronomic value.

Les Barques del Peix (The fish' boats) 
Floating extension of the Fishing Museum itself, consisting of the boats 'Gacela', the old fishing boat of dragging, and the "Polar Star", dedicated to fishing encircling.

Càtedra d'Estudis Marítims (Maritime Studies Chair) 
It's part of the University of Girona in the territory and its objective is to become a platform for study, external projection and dissemination of the marine and fishing activity of the Girona coastline.

DOCUMARE 
Information and documentation service specialized in maritime and fishing issues. It adds and disseminates information and documentation with added value in order to promote research, knowledge, value and raise awareness of society towards activity, culture and maritime heritage.

References 

Maritime museums in Catalonia
Museums established in 2002
2002 establishments in Spain
Museums in Baix Empordà
Fishing museums